Royal Academy of Sciences may refer to:

French Academy of Sciences
Royal Academy of Sciences of Bologna
Spanish Royal Academy of Sciences
Swedish Royal Academy of Sciences
Royal Academy of Sciences of Lisbon, now the Sciences Academy of Lisbon

See also
Royal Academy